Raising the Bar is the eleventh studio album by Canadian country music artist Terri Clark. It was released on September 14, 2018 via BareTrack Records. The album's first single, "Young as We Are Tonight", was released to Canadian country radio on August 24, 2018.

Commercial performance
The album debuted at No. 42 on Billboards Independent Albums, selling 1,100 copies in the first week.

Track listing
Track listing adapted from iTunes.

Chart performance

References

2018 albums
Terri Clark albums